is a 2003 Japanese historical fantasy film directed by Yōjirō Takita, starring Mansai Nomura as onmyōji Abe no Seimei. Both it and its predecessor, Onmyōji, are based on the Onmyōji series of novels by author Baku Yumemakura.

The Yin Yang Master 2 was released on DVD and VCD in the Philippines in early 2005.

Cast
Mansai Nomura as Abe no Seimei
Hideaki Itō as Minamoto no Hiromasa
Eriko Imai as Mitsumushi
Kyōko Fukada as Himiko
Kiichi Nakai as Genkaku
Hayato Ichihara as Susa

References

External links

陰陽師II (Onmyōji II) on Toho's official website

2003 films
Films directed by Yōjirō Takita
Films scored by Shigeru Umebayashi
Films set in the 10th century
Jidaigeki films
2000s Japanese films